Blebak Beach also known as Pantai Blebak is a tourist beach in Sekuro Village, Jepara, Central Java. This beach is located 10 km southward of the hall of the Office of the Regent of Jepara.

Access
Blebak Beach located in the village of Sekuro, District Mlonggo, Jepara regency. No need to worry for the access road to the beach Blebak in the District of Mlonggo this. Besides not too far from the center of Jepara, All access road condition is very good.

Panorama
The beach is clean in between the pieces of soft corals. The location is very far from the crowds, the air is dry and cool lull.

Blebak Beach offers a number of family rides, such as the Water Bike Pedal Boats in a small lake shore.

Vehicle
Blebak Beach has several rides, namely:
 Sapta Pesona Boats
 Water Bike Pedal Boats
 pedicab Water
 Canoe
 Banana Boat
 Donut buoy (float tire in the car)
 Duck Buoy (buoys form of a duck)
 Kid's Park (Playground Children)

Facility
Blebak beach has several facilities, namely:
 Mosque
 Rinse Room
 Toilet
 Trash can
 Parking Park for Car, Motorcycle, and Bicycle

References

Tourism in Jepara
Tourist attractions in Central Java
Beaches of Indonesia
Landforms of Central Java
Landforms of Java